Euthymius of Constantinople (fl. 1050) was a monk who wrote about the Bogomils.

References 

11th-century Byzantine monks
11th-century Byzantine writers